The ATP Bordeaux is a defunct men's tennis tournament that was held annually under variations of the name Grand Prix Passing Shot and was part of the Grand Prix tennis circuit tour from (1979-1989) it then became an ATP Tour event until 1995. The tournament was played on two different surfaces during its tenure: clay from 1979 through 1990 and hard from 1991 through 1995.

Guy Forget was the only man to win the tournament more than once, doing so in 1990 and 1991. Yannick Noah, the only other Frenchman to triumph in the singles event, won the inaugural event of 1979.

Results

Singles

Doubles

External links
ATP website

 
Clay court tennis tournaments
Hard court tennis tournaments
Defunct tennis tournaments in France
Sport in Bordeaux
ATP Tour
Grand Prix tennis circuit
1979 establishments in France
1995 disestablishments in France